Howard L. Lasher (1944–2007) was an American Democratic Party politician from Brooklyn. He was the first Orthodox Jew elected to state office in New York. He was the first to ever wear a Kippah in the New York assembly.

Political career
Lasher was a well-known politician in Brooklyn, New York, for over thirty-five years. He was a member of the New York State Assembly from 1973 to 1993, sitting in the 180th, 181st, 182nd, 183rd, 184th, 185th, 186th, 187th, 188th, 189th and 190th New York State Legislatures. He was a member of the New York City Council from 1994 to 2001.  He had represented Brooklyn's 47th District on the City Council, representing Coney Island, Brighton Beach and the surrounding communities.

New York Deprogramming Bill
Lasher was the principal author of the "New York Deprogramming Bill, which would have allowed courts to appoint temporary guardians to remove people forcibly from cults.  The New York State Assembly passed the bill 77-64, as did the New York State Senate 35-23.  However, it was vetoed in July 1981 by New York Governor Hugh Carey.

Council member
While a Council Member, Lasher funded the reconstruction of Brighton Playground, in 1995.  As an Assemblyman, Lasher served as Chairman of New York State Governor Mario Cuomo's Insurance Committee.

In November 2000, Lasher helped fund a $2 million reconstruction of the playground area of Calvert Vaux Park, a  park in New York City; named for Calvert Vaux, the designer of Central Park.

Later years
Lasher did not run in the 2001 Brooklyn City Council elections due to term limits. His wife, Susan Lasher, ran and lost to Domenic Recchia, receiving 2,999 votes to his 4,509.

Howard Lasher died in his Ocean Parkway, New York home, on March 11, 2007.

Education
Brooklyn Law School
Brooklyn College
Yeshiva University High School for Boys

References

Politicians from Brooklyn
Jewish American state legislators in New York (state)
New York City Council members
Democratic Party members of the New York State Assembly
1944 births
2007 deaths
Brooklyn Law School alumni
20th-century American politicians
20th-century American Jews
21st-century American Jews